Sideroxylon fimbriatum is a species of plant in the family Sapotaceae. It is endemic to Yemen.  Its natural habitat is subtropical or tropical dry forests.

References

fimbriatum
Endemic flora of Socotra
Vulnerable plants
Taxonomy articles created by Polbot
Taxa named by Isaac Bayley Balfour